Frank Cassidy (November 7, 1895 – February 28, 1924) was an American boxer. He competed in the men's lightweight event at the 1920 Summer Olympics. At the 1920 Summer Olympics, he defeated Ko Janssens of the Netherlands in his first fight, before being eliminated by Gotfred Johansen of Denmark in the quarterfinals.

References

1895 births
1924 deaths
American male boxers
Olympic boxers of the United States
Boxers at the 1920 Summer Olympics
Boxers from New York City
Lightweight boxers